Grace Passô (born May 20, 1980) is a Brazilian actress, director and playwright.  Her film acting credits include Temporada and Praça Paris.

As a writer, Passô has won the Associação Paulista de Críticos de Arte Award for "Best Playwright.

Filmography

Movies

Television

References

External links
 

1980 births
Living people
21st-century Brazilian dramatists and playwrights
Brazilian television actresses
Brazilian film actresses
21st-century Brazilian women writers
Brazilian women dramatists and playwrights